Fiji competed at the 2000 Summer Paralympics in Sydney, Australia.

The country was represented by four athletes competing in three sports. No Fiji Islander won any medals.

Athletics
 Men's Javelin F37: Atunaisa Domonibitu
 Men's 100 m T12: Fuata Faktaufon

Judo
 Men's -73 kg: Ratu Tevita Susu

Swimming
 Men's 100 m Freestyle S9: Manasa Marisiale
 Men's 200 m Medley S9: Manasa Marisiale
 Men's 50 m Freestyle S9: Manasa Marisiale

See also
Fiji at the 2000 Summer Olympics

References

Nations at the 2000 Summer Paralympics
2000
Paralympics